Bahr el Gazel Sud is one of two departments of Chad in Bahr el Gazel, a region of Chad. Its capital is Moussoro.

Departments of Chad
Bahr el Gazel Region